"Breaking the Game" is a short story by American writer Orson Scott Card.  It appears in his short story collections Capitol and The Worthing Saga.  Card first published it in the January 1979 issue of Analog Science Fiction and Fact.

Plot summary
Herman Nuber has just woken up from a state of suspended animation brought on by the fictional drug Somec and is looking forward to returning to his virtual world conquest game.  Unfortunately for him, his position is being played by someone else and that person does not want to sell it for any price.  When he discovers how poorly the person is playing, he becomes desperate and arranges to meet the other player.  He is shocked to discover that the other player is his own grandson, Abner Doon.  Abner tells Herman that he is going to completely destroy his position.  After this is done, Herman meets with Abner again and learns that he plans on doing the same thing to the empire in the real world.  When he tries to warn people, Herman is locked away in a psychiatric hospital for five years until he is convinced that it is not true.  At the end of Herman’s life, they meet one last time and Abner says he is sorry for ruining the game.

Connection to the Worthing Saga
This story uses several plot elements also used in The Worthing Saga, such as the sleeping drug Somec and the taping of memories.  It takes place on the planet Capitol shortly after the events in the story "Lifeloop".  The story of Abner Doon’s destruction of Herman Nuber’s game position also appears in a much shorter form as a part of chapter 4 in Card's novel The Worthing Chronicle.

See also

List of works by Orson Scott Card
Orson Scott Card

External links
 The official Orson Scott Card website

External links

1979 short stories
Short stories by Orson Scott Card
Works originally published in Analog Science Fiction and Fact